N'Goutjina is a village and rural commune in the Cercle of Koutiala in the Sikasso Region of southern Mali. The commune covers an area of 236 square kilometers and includes 8 villages. In the 2009 census it had a population of 18,667. The village of N'Goutjina, the administrative centre (chef-lieu) of the commune, is 10 km south of Koutiala.

References

External links
.

Communes of Sikasso Region